Otolorin Kehinde Peter, performing as Kenny Blaq, is a Nigerian stand-up comedian and singer.  He performed at the 2nd edition of Unlock Naija Independence celebration and Africa Magic Owambe Finale

Early life
kenny Blaq had both primary and secondary education in Ejigbo Lagos, he had to leave SS3 for a tutorial where he had his WASSCE exam when his parents couldn't afford the school fee.

He trained as a compere and presenter at the FRCN training school in Lagos after having had a stint with SMA FM, a college community-based radio station.

Career 
Blaq started his comedy career in 2008, and has performed at top comedy events within and outside Nigeria like I laff with Mc Abbey, Gbenga Adeyinka (Laffmattaz), Ali Baba's (January 1st concert) & Fina - Ali , Mc Amana's (DiSpeakable Me), Cool FM Praise JAM, DAREY's Love Like A Movie, AY LIVE, BasketMouth's (Lord of the Ribs), Africa Laughs (Uganda), SEKA Live (Rwanda) ECOFEST (Sierra Leone) and BENIN GLO LAFFTA FEST (Nigeria)

His self titled comedy concert The Oxymoron Of Kennyblaq won Best Comedy Show at the 2017 and 2018 Naija 102.3 FM Comedy Awards for the first two years during its three-year run.

Blaq's first internationally headlined event was staged at the Indigo O2 on 30 September 2018, titled "Kenny Blaq 'State of Mind, in partnership with SMADE a UK based international show promoter, further solidified his name as one Nigeria's finest comedy export. This aided Kenny Blaq's appearance at "Indaba X; The Laughing Leopard Comedy event", as the events headliner, which took place at Royal Festival Hall.

Blaq was recognised in 2018 as one of the 100 most influential youths in Africa, after winning The Future Awards Africa prize for comedy in the Year 2017, and, in 2020, received the Ooni Youth Royal Award. In 2020, Blaq and crew kicked off a nationwide tour, with their first call in the east at Federal University of Technology Owerri in Imo state, and making their way westward to Ile-Ife at the Obafemi Awolowo University Campus, the tour was put on hold due to the COVID-19 pandemic. Inside OAU Innovations, a media company in Obafemi Awolowo University, reported that Blaq held a sold-out concert held at Amphitheatre, attended by over 5,000 people. The tour continued on in December to Abuja, where it ended its year run. Blaq made a 12-city tour of the United Kingdom in 2021, after the lockdown, with another promoter Akinlolu Jenkins.

On November 17, 2021, a comedy special shot by Blaq in Lagos  debuted on popular video streaming platform Netflix, making him the first home based comedian out of West Africa to get his production fully licensed by the platform .

Awards

References

External links 

 

Living people
1994 births
Nigerian male comedians
Nigerian television personalities
People from Lagos
Nigerian twins
Fraternal twins
Residents of Lagos